Raymond Thomas Adams (September 28, 1912 – August 26, 1992) was an American professional basketball player. He played for the Oshkosh All-Stars and Chicago Bruins in the National Basketball League and averaged 4.1 points per game.

Adams also coached high school basketball, served in World War II, and became a tax and financial consultant.

References

1912 births
1992 deaths
United States Army personnel of World War II
American men's basketball players
Basketball players from Chicago
Centers (basketball)
Chicago Bruins players
DePaul Blue Demons men's basketball players
Forwards (basketball)
High school basketball coaches in the United States
Oshkosh All-Stars players